Arcadia may refer to:

Places

Australia
 Arcadia, New South Wales, a suburb of Sydney
 Arcadia, Queensland
 Arcadia, Victoria

Greece
 Arcadia (region), a region in the central Peloponnese
 Arcadia (regional unit), a modern administrative unit covering the region
 Kyparissia in Messenia, a town known in the Middle Ages as Arcadia
 Barony of Arcadia, a medieval Frankish fiefdom of the Principality of Achaea
 Arcadia (Crete), a town and city-state of ancient Crete

Ukraine
 Arcadia (Odesa), a quarter in Odesa
 Arcadia Beach
 Arcadia Park, Odesa

United States
 Arcadia (Phoenix), a neighborhood in Phoenix and Scottsdale, Arizona
 Arcadia, California
 Arcadia, Florida
 Arcadia, Illinois
 Arcadia, Indiana
 Arcadia, Iowa
 Arcadia, Kansas
 Arcadia, Louisiana
 Arcadia, Maryland
 Arcadia, Michigan
 Arcadia Lake (Michigan)
 Arcadia, Mississippi
 Arcadia, Missouri
 Arcadia, Nebraska
 Arcadia, New York
 Arcadia, North Carolina
 Arcadia, Ohio
 Arcadia, Oklahoma
 Arcadia, Pennsylvania
 Arcadia, Rhode Island
 Arcadia, South Carolina
 Arcadia, Tennessee
 Arcadia, Santa Fe, Texas
 Arcadia, Shelby County, Texas
 Arcadia, Botetourt County, Virginia
 Arcadia, Spotsylvania County, Virginia
 Arcadia, Washington
 Arcadia, Wisconsin
 Arcadia (town), Wisconsin
 Arcadia Lake (Oklahoma)
 Arcadia Management Area, Rhode Island
 Arcadia Township (disambiguation)

Elsewhere
 Arcadia, Tucumán, Argentina
 Arcadia, Nova Scotia, Canada
 Arcadia Aegypti, an ancient region of Roman-controlled Egypt
 Arcadia, Pretoria, a residential suburb in South Africa
 Arcadia, a suburb of Harare, Zimbabwe
 Arcadia Planitia, a plain on Mars

Boats
Arcadia 30, a French sailboat design

Businesses
 Arcadia Brewing Company, a former brewery in Kalamazoo, Michigan
 Arcadia Corporation, the original name of video game company Starpath
 Arcadia Group, formerly a British retail company
 Arcadia Machine & Tool, commonly known as AMT, an American firearms company
 Arcadia Productions, an Italian theatre company
 Arcadia Publishing, an American publisher of local community histories
 Arcadia Systems, an arcade game division of the company Mastertronic

Film and television
 Arcadia (film), a 2012 American film
 "Arcadia" (The X-Files), a 1999 television episode
 Arcadia, a fictional city on Gallifrey in the Doctor Who series
 Arcadia, a fictional location in Resident Evil: Afterlife
 Tales of Arcadia, an animated television series created by Guillermo del Toro

Gaming
 Arcadia (card game), a 1996 collectible card game by White Wolf Publishing
 Arcadia (video game), a 1982 game for the Vic 20 and ZX Spectrum platforms
 Arcadia 2001, a gaming console
 Arcadia (Dungeons & Dragons), a fictional plane of existence in Dungeons & Dragons
 Arcadia (The Longest Journey), a fantasy realm in The Longest Journey
 Arcadia Bay, a fictional location in Life Is Strange
 Arcadia, a human colony in Halo Wars

Literature and drama
 Arcadia (comics), a character in Marvel Comics
 Arcadia (magazine), a 2005 Colombian magazine on arts, literature and movies
 Arcadia (play), a 1993 play by Tom Stoppard
 Arcadia (poem), a 1504 poem by Jacopo Sannazaro
 The Countess of Pembroke's Arcadia or Arcadia, a prose work by Sir Philip Sidney
 Monthly Arcadia (月刊アルカディア), a 2000 Japanese video and arcade game magazine
 Arcadia, a 1979 poetry collection by Christopher Reid
 Arcadia, a fictional spaceship in Space Pirate Captain Harlock
 Arcadia, a 2015 book by Iain Pears

Music
 Arcadia (band), a British pop music group composed of members from Duran Duran
 "Arcadia" (Hardwell and Joey Dale song), a 2014 song by Hardwell and Joey Dale
 Arcadia (album), a 2014 album by Caroline Polachek, under the name Ramona Lisa
 "Arcadia", a 2015 song by the Kite String Tangle
 "Arcadia" (Lana Del Rey song), 2021
 Arcadia, a mid-1990s London club night, central to the Romo movement

Schools
 Academy of Arcadia, a historical Italian literary academy
 Arcadia College, Missouri
 Arcadia University, Glenside, Pennsylvania
 Arcadia High School (disambiguation)

Ships
 See List of ships named Arcadia
 Arcadia (steamboat), a steamboat that operated in the state of Washington, United States
 MV Arcadia (1988) or MV Columbus, a cruise ship
 MV Arcadia (2004), a cruise ship
 SS Arcadia (1922)
 SS Arcadia (1953)
 USS Arcadia (SP-856), a patrol boat possibly in commission during 1918
 USS Arcadia (ID-1605), a troop transport commissioned in 1919
 USS Arcadia (AD-23), a destroyer tender commissioned in 1945

Visual arts
 Arcadia (painting), an 1883 painting by Thomas Eakins
 Arcadia, a 1973 artwork by Ian Hamilton Finlay
 Arcadia, an 1893 mural by Amanda Brewster Sewell
 Arcadia, a painting by Eugeniusz Zak

Other uses
 Arcadia (daughter of Arcadius) (400–444)
 Arcadia (engineering), a system and software architecture engineering method
 Arcadia (genus), an extinct genus of temnospondyl amphibian
 Arcadia (house), a historic house in Frederick, Maryland
 Arcadia (Los Angeles Metro station)
 Arcadia (utopia), a utopian vision of pastoralism
 Arcadia Conference, a 1942 military conference
 Arcadia Fund, a foundation sponsoring preservation of media for culture, nature, and scholarship
 Arcadia Plantation, a historic plantation near Georgetown, South Carolina

See also
 Arcadian (disambiguation)
 Arcadians (disambiguation)
 The Arcadians (disambiguation)
 
 Arcade (disambiguation)
 Acadia (disambiguation)
 Arkadia (disambiguation)